Robert or Bob Bennett may refer to:

Arts and entertainment

Music
 Robert Russell Bennett (1894–1981), American composer
 Bobby Bennett (The Famous Flames) (1938–2013), member of James Brown's singing group The Famous Flames
 Bob Bennett, drummer for The Sonics
 Bob Bennett (singer-songwriter) (born 1955), Christian music vocalist and acoustic guitarist
 Bobby Bennett, Jr. (born 1986), contestant on season 5 of American Idol

Writing
 Robert Bennett (theologian) (died 1687), English author
 Robert Jackson Bennett (born 1984), American author

Politics
 Robert Bennett (Melbourne mayor) (1822–1891), mayor of Melbourne, 1861–1862
 Robert Frederick Bennett (1927–2000), Governor of Kansas, 1975–1979
 Bob Bennett (politician) (1933–2016), U.S. Senator from Utah, 1993–2011
 Robert T. Bennett (1939–2014), chairman of the Ohio Republican Party

Sports
 Robert Bennett (athlete) (1919–1974), 1948 Olympic bronze medalist in hammer throw
 Bob Bennett (swimmer) (born 1943), 1960 and 1964 Olympic bronze medalist in swimming
 Bob Bennett (baseball) (1933–2020), American college baseball coach
 Robert Bennett (cricketer) (1831–1875), English cricketer
 Bob Bennett (rugby league), Australian player and coach
 Bob Bennett (cricketer) (born 1940), former English cricketer

Others
 Robert A. Bennett (born 1941), American business journalist
 Robert R. Bennett (born 1958), American businessman
 Robert L. Bennett (1912–2002), Native American lawyer and official with the Bureau of Indian Affairs
 Robert S. Bennett (born 1939), President Bill Clinton's attorney
 Robert W. Bennett (born 1941), American legal scholar and former dean of Northwestern University School of Law
 Bob Bennett (bishop) (born 1949), Anglican bishop in Canada
 Robert David Bennett, Australian criminal and sex offender

See also
 Bobby Bennett (disambiguation)
 Robert Bennet (disambiguation)
 Robert Benet, English Protestant martyr